Hankins' Store is a historic commercial building at Ferry Road and Main Street (Arkansas Highway 14) in Oil Trough, Arkansas.  It is a single-story wood-frame structure, built out of local cypress lumber, with a gable roof and clapboard siding that is original to its 1904 construction.  An open porch extends across its front.  The store stands near the White River Slough, a former course of the White River.  It served the local community for almost exactly 100 years, closing in 2004, and typifies early 20th-century general stores.

The building was listed on the National Register of Historic Places in 2014.

See also
National Register of Historic Places listings in Independence County, Arkansas

References

Commercial buildings on the National Register of Historic Places in Arkansas
Commercial buildings completed in 1904
National Register of Historic Places in Independence County, Arkansas
1904 establishments in Arkansas